Sampson Theatre is a historic theater building located at Penn Yan in Yates County, New York. It was built in 1910, and is a three-story, poured in place, concrete building.  It measures 60 feet wide and 100 feet deep and consists of two sections; a front auditorium section and a rear stage section.  Both sections are covered by gambrel roofs.  The theater was originally used for vaudeville and as a movie theater.  In 1929, it was converted for use as a miniature golf course, and later was used as a warehouse for tires.

It was listed on the National Register of Historic Places in 2008.

References

Theatres on the National Register of Historic Places in New York (state)
Theatres completed in 1910
Buildings and structures in Yates County, New York
National Register of Historic Places in Yates County, New York
1910 establishments in New York (state)